Serbian South African is a South African citizen of Serbian descent or Serbia-born person who resides in South Africa.

History
The Kingdom of Yugoslavia did not give too much attention to the community of Yugoslavs in the Union of South Africa. The state did not send teachers, priests or financially assistance to local associations, such as was the case with communities in North and South America. In 1941, According to the first Yugoslav general consul in Cape Town Stojan Gavrilović, the local community was in chaotic situation. In 1942 the Royal Yugoslav Army sent agents on a mission to Cape Town to recruit local male civilians of Yugoslav descent to help with the war effort.

In 1952 Serbian community that left Socialist Federative Republic of Yugoslavia after World War II founded a local Saint Sava church and school municipality in Johannesburg. In 1978. local Serbian Orthodox Church dedicated to Thomas the Apostle was built. Today local schools teach students Serbian language with support and under the program defined by Ministry of Education of Serbia.

In 1962 Serbian modernist author Miloš Crnjanski first published his work Lament over Belgrade in Johannesburg.

During the 1999 NATO bombing of Yugoslavia, Serbian South Africans and other supporters staged demonstrations against the NATO bombing campaigns that devastated Serbia in Cape Town, Johannesburg, and Pretoria. 

In 2012 the case of extradition of Željko Ražnatović killer Dobrosav Gavrić from South Africa to Serbia attracted media attention in both countries and South African journalist and editor in chief of City Press claimed that state become a haven for Serbian criminals.

On 2013 Presentation of Jesus at the Temple local church in Johannesburg marked the anniversary of Serbian Revolution where 22 folklore groups took part in presentation of Serbian folklore.

Serb Club "Zavičaj", Church and School Municipality Saint Sava, Serb Cultural and Artistic Society "Africa" and Association "Serbian Unity" are active in South Africa.

Notable people
 Dejan Bogunović, footballer
 Veselin Jelušić, football manager
 Milutin Sredojević, football manager
 Kosta Papić, football coach

See also
 South Africa-Serbia relations
 Serb diaspora

References

External links
Serbian Orthodox Church Saint Thomas, Johannesburg

South Africa
South Africa
South Africa
Ethnic groups in South Africa
European diaspora in Africa
European South African